The Shakhty Museum of local lore is a museum in the city of Shakhty, Rostov Region of Russia. The Museum building is an architectural monument of the late nineteenth century. The Museum was founded in 1966, opened on May 18, 1967.

History  

The Museum is located in the center of Shakhty, it was built in 1896. In 1896, the building was named in honor of Empress Alexandra Feodorovna, in memory of the coronation of Nicholas II and Alexandra, Alexander Church parish school opened there in 1907.

Design 
The Central room of the building features high domed ceilings, creating an atmosphere of antiquity.

Contents 
The Museum's main Fund has about 13 000 units. The Museum hosts ancient icons and photographs, historical documents, household items and personal belongings. At its opening, the Academy of arts of the USSR donated about 200 paintings to the Museum.

The Museum has themed rooms: "Old town", "petty-bourgeois life", "the Military glory of the city", "Nature of the don region". In the art gallery, exhibitions include graphics, painting and applied art. They host musical and poetic evenings.

Five thematic halls are in the Museum. Two are devoted to the Great Patriotic war including weapons, soldiers' personal belongings, photos and documents. One of the Museum's exhibitions is devoted to local nature. Many animals and birds live in the region. The Museum also offers an exhibit on coal mining.

On November 12, 2015 the Museum emptied a burned-down building dedicated to the coal industry and moved its contents to the local history Museum.

The Museum has a Literary Association named after the poet Alexei Nedogonov.

References 

Museums in Rostov Oblast
Cultural heritage monuments of regional significance in Rostov Oblast